Strange Jørgenssøn (7 April 1539 – 5 February 1610) was a Danish/Norwegian businessman and bailiff. He was born in Faaborg; the son of Jørgen van der Huus and Margrethe Bullgers. He served as bailiff of Lyse Abbey, Munkeliv Abbey, Giske and Nordland. He established an institution for poor women in Bergen 1609. He died in Bergen in 1610.

References

1539 births
1610 deaths
16th-century Danish people
Norwegian businesspeople
Norwegian civil servants
People from Faaborg-Midtfyn Municipality